Niranjan Narhari Bhagat (18 May 1926 – 1 February 2018) was an Indian Gujarati language poet and commentator who won the 1999 Sahitya Akademi Award for Gujarati language for his critical work Gujarati Sahiyta – Purvardha Uttarardha. He was also an English poet, and had written over a hundred poems in English, most being written in the style of Gitanjali.

Early life
Niranjan Narhari Bhagat was born on 18 May 1926 in Ahmedabad. He completed M.A. in English Literature in 1950.

Career

Bhagat joined L. D. Arts College as a lecturer. Later he joined Saint Xavier's College, Ahmedabad, as a professor of English in 1975 and served there until his retirement. He served as the president of Gujarati Sahitya Parishad in 1997–98. He also served as a member of Advisory Board for Gujarati, Sahitya Akademi, Delhi, from 1963 to 1967.

He received Narmad Suvarna Chandrak in 1953 for his book Chhandolay and Sahitya Akademi Award in 1999 for his critical work Gujarati Sahiyta – Purvardha Uttarardha. He also received Kumar Suvarna Chandrak in 1949, Ranjitram Suvarna Chandrak in 1969, Premanand Suvarna Chandrak in 1998, Sachchidanand Sanman in 2000 and the Narsinh Mehta Award in 2001.

Death
Bhagat died of a stroke on 1 February 2018 at a hospital in Ahmedabad at the age of 91.

See also
 List of Sahitya Akademi Award winners for Gujarati
 List of Gujarati-language writers

References

Further reading
 
 

1926 births
2018 deaths
Recipients of the Sahitya Akademi Award in Gujarati
Gujarati-language poets
Writers from Ahmedabad
Indian literary critics
Poets from Gujarat
20th-century Indian poets
Recipients of the Ranjitram Suvarna Chandrak